Sri Ragavendra Polytechnic College was established in 1997 at Komarapalayam, Namakkal, Tamil Nadu, India. It is an ISO 9001:2015 Certified Institution.  It is affiliated to the All India Council for Technical Education (New Delhi) and the Directorate of Technical Education (Tamil Nadu).

Courses offered
 Diploma in Civil Engineering
 Diploma in Mechanical Engineering
 Diploma in Automobile Engineering
 Diploma in Electrical and Electronics Engineering
 Diploma in Electronics and Communication Engineering
 Diploma in Computer Science Engineering

Campus

Building 
The college building is near Cauvery River.

Playground
The college has a large playground for sports, games and other athletics needs.

Canteen 
The college canteen is located inside the campus and is open during college hours. It serves vegetarian food.

Hostels 
The hostels for boys and girls are available for students from different places and are situated within the campus.

Library 
The college library is located inside the academic building.  It contains huge amount of books where all students from different stream can have access to all books.

Conference hall
The college campus has a spacious conference hall where all events are organised.

References

External links
 

Engineering colleges in Tamil Nadu
Education in Namakkal district
Educational institutions established in 1997
1997 establishments in Tamil Nadu